Boisset is a surname. Notable people with the surname include: 

Éric Boisset (born 1965), French writer
Jean-Charles Boisset (born 1969), French vintner 
Raymond Boisset (1912–1991), French sprinter
Yves Boisset (born 1939), French film director and scriptwriter